Julian Daryl Richards  is a British archaeologist and academic. He works at the University of York, and is co-director of the Archaeology Data Service (ADS), and Internet Archaeology. He is also the director of the Centre for Digital Heritage at the university, and contributed to the founding of The White Rose College of the Arts & Humanities. His work focuses on the archaeological applications of information technology. He has participated in excavations at Cottam, Cowlam, Burdale, Wharram Percy, and Heath Wood barrow cemetery.

Career

Richards studied archaeology and anthropology at the University of Cambridge, after switching from history. He began his Ph.D. in 1980, researching burial rituals among pre-Christian Anglo-Saxons. In the 1970s or 1980s Richards was a volunteer in the excavations of Viking Age settlements around the Coppergate Shopping Centre in York. He then spent time at the University of Leeds, before returning to York in 1986 to lecture about Anglo-Saxon and Viking archaeology at the University of York.

Richards lectured at the University of York, concentrating on Anglo-Saxon and Viking Age archaeology, particularly mortuary behaviour and settlement evolution, in England. In that capacity he published Viking Age England in 1991, and has worked at Cottam, Cowlam, Burdale, Wharram Percy, and Heath Wood barrow cemetery.

Another concentration of Richards is the intersection of archaeology and technology. In 1985 he co-edited a textbook on archaeological computing, Current Issues in Archaeological Computing, a focus of subsequent books and papers. He is the director of the Archaeology Data Service, a digital archive of archaeological research, and the co-director of Internet Archaeology, an electronic peer-reviewed journal. He is also the director the Centre for Digital Heritage at the University of York. He was elected a Fellow of the Society of Antiquaries in 1991 and is a Member of the Chartered Institute for Archaeologists (MCIfA).

Selected works

References

Bibliography

External links
 List of publications on ResearchGate

Year of birth missing (living people)
Living people
British archaeologists
Academics of the University of York